Kornél Nagy (born 21 November 1986) is a Hungarian handball player who plays for US Dunkerque HB and the Hungarian national team.

He participated in five European Championships (2008, 2010, 2012, 2014, 2016) and three World Championships (2007, 2011, 2013).

Achievements
Nemzeti Bajnokság I:
Winner: 2011
Bronze Medalist: 2006, 2007, 2008, 2009
Nemzeti Bajnokság I/B:
Winner: 2005
France Handball League:
Winner:  2014
Magyar Kupa:
Winner: 2011
Coupe de la Ligue:
Winner: 2013
EHF Cup:
Finalist: 2012
Junior World Championship:
Bronze Medalist: 2005

Individual awards
 Nemzeti Bajnokság I Top Scorer: 2010
 Junior Prima Award: 2010
 LNH Player of the Month: December 2011

References

External links
Kornél Nagy career statistics on Worldhandball.com

Hungarian male handball players
Living people
1986 births
People from Püspökladány
Expatriate handball players
Hungarian expatriates in France
Veszprém KC players
Sportspeople from Hajdú-Bihar County